There are 12 public holidays in Barbados, also called bank holidays locally:

External links
 Public Holidays for the Year 2020 (PDF) – Ministry of Labour

References

 
Holidays
Barbadian culture
Barbados